Mpho Franklyn Parks Tau (born 1970) is a South African politician who has been a Deputy Minister of Cooperative Governance and Traditional Affairs since March 2023 and a Member of the National Assembly of South Africa since February 2023, representing the African National Congress. Before becoming a member of Parliament, Tau had been a Member of the Gauteng Provincial Legislature where he served in the Gauteng Executive Council as MEC for Economic Development from December 2020 to October 2022. Prior to that, he was Deputy Minister of Cooperative Governance and Traditional Affairs between May 2019 and December 2020.

Tau was the second democratically elected mayor, after Amos Masondo, of the Unified City of Johannesburg. He lost the mayoralty to the DA's Herman Mashaba in a historic defeat on the 22 of August 2016. From 2018 to 2022, he was the provincial treasurer of the Gauteng ANC branch. In December 2022, he was elected to a five-year term on the National Executive Committee of the African National Congress.

Early life and education
Tau was born in Orlando West, a neighbourhood of Soweto, on 6 June 1970. At the age of fourteen, he joined the Congress of South African Students (COSAS), and became engaged in student activism for the first time. In the 1980s, he was detained several times during national states of emergency—periods of strict restrictions on anti-apartheid activities—which were declared by the apartheid government of the time that was determined to regain control over the population. Tau was later elected president of the Student Representative Council at Pace Commercial College. In 1989, at the age of 19, Tau was elected president of the Soweto Youth Congress, and later he became a member of the African National Congress Youth League.

Early career 
He was 24 years old when he was elected regional secretary of the ANC in Johannesburg and in 1996, he went on to serve on the Southern Metropolitan Local Council's Urban Development Committee. In 2000, Tau was appointed as a Member of the Mayoral Committee (MMC) of Johannesburg, overseeing the portfolios of Developmental Planning, Transportation, and Environment from 2000 to 2003, as well as the Finance and Economic Development portfolio between 2003 and 2011.

Mayor of Johannesburg 
After the ANC retained their majority of seats on the Johannesburg City Council in the municipal elections held on 18 May 2011, Tau was fielded as the party's candidate to succeed Amos Masondo at the inaugural council meeting on 26 May. Tau easily defeated a challenge from the DA's Mmusi Maimane, winning with over 160 votes to become the second mayor of the Johannesburg metro.

During his time in office, Tau focused on continuing the work of his predecessor, expanding the public transport system, committed to a ZAR 100 billion infrastructure programme, rolled out citywide free Internet access, and added the Jozi@Work employment scheme. In 2012, it was reported that Tau's wife, Pilisiwe Twala-Tau received a stake in a Capitec Bank black economic empowerment deal in 2006 worth around R10 million to manage the Johannesburg council's R2-billion liability redemption fund, led by Regiments Capital. At the time, Tau was the MMC responsible for treasury and was responsible for the awarding of the contract.

For the 2016 municipal elections, Tau was selected as the ANC's mayoral candidate for the metro. In the municipal elections, the ANC's lost its majority on the city council for the first time. The party's vote share in the metro declined to only 45% while the DA received 38% of the vote. The kingmakers in council, the Economic Freedom Fighters, subsequently announced that they would vote for the DA's mayoral candidate, Herman Mashaba at the inaugural council meeting to oust Tau. Mashaba was elected mayor on 23 August 2016, defeating Tau in a vote that went 144–125. He subsequently took up the position of leader of the opposition in council.

Gauteng politics
At the ANC's provincial conference in July 2018, Tau was elected as the provincial treasurer of the party.

Provincial legislature and national government
The following year, he vacated his position as leader of the ANC caucus in the Johannesburg City Council after having been elected to the Gauteng Provincial Legislature in the 2019 general election. Shortly afterwards, Tau was appointed as Deputy Minister of Cooperative Governance and Traditional Affairs in the cabinet of Cyril Ramaphosa. He was the only deputy minister appointed to not be a Member of Parliament.

Gauteng Executive Council 
In December 2020, Gauteng premier David Makhura announced a reshuffle of his provincial executive, in which Tau was appointed as Member of the Executive Council (MEC) for Economic Development. He resigned from the National Executive to be sworn in as a member of the Gauteng Provincial Legislature to take up the position. Morakane Mosupyoe succeeded Tau as provincial treasurer at the ANC's provincial conference in June 2022. Tau was not elected to the ANC Provincial Elective Committee (PEC), which led to speculation that he would be removed from the Executive Council. After Panyaza Lesufi was promoted to premier in October 2022, he announced his executive council, which excluded Tau. Tau was subsequently made chairperson of the legislature's Finance Committee.

Return to national government 
Tau was, however, elected to the National Executive Committee of the African National Congress at the party's 55th National  Coference in December 2022. On 26 January 2023, it was announced that Tau would be sworn in as a member of the National Assembly of South Africa amid speculation that he would be appointed to cabinet as a minister. On 1 February 2023, Tau was replaced as chairperson of the Gauteng legislature's Finance Committee after he had resigned from the provincial legislature.  Tau was sworn in as a Member of Parliament on 6 February 2023. A month later, he returned to the position of Deputy Minister of Cooperative Governance and Traditional Affairs following a cabinet reshuffle done by Ramaphosa.

Philanthropy

Tau is involved in numerous charitable activities.

He took part in the 2013 edition of the Mayoral Charity Golf Day  which raised over R1 million for various non-governmental organizations that assist in improving the lives of those suffering with HIV/AIDS.

On 10 December 2011 and 1 December 2012, Tau hosted a birthday party called the Every Child Birthday Party, which is a party hosted for children who may suffer from a range of vulnerabilities, including disabilities and being orphaned.

References

Living people
Mayors of Johannesburg
African National Congress politicians
1970 births
Members of the Gauteng Provincial Legislature
Members of the National Assembly of South Africa